Fulla is an ásynja in Norse mythology.

Fulla may also refer to:
 Fulla (doll), a Middle-Eastern fashion doll

People with the name
 Fulla Al Jazairia or Fella El Djazairia (born 1961), Algerian singer
 Ľudovít Fulla (1902–1980), Slovak painter